An Epstein frame or Epstein square is a standardised measurement device for measuring the magnetic properties of soft magnetic materials, especially used for testing of electrical steels. 

The International Standard for the measurement configuration and conditions are defined by the standard IEC 60404-2:2008 Magnetic materials - Part 2: Methods of measurement of the magnetic properties of electrical steel sheet and strip by means of an Epstein frame published by International Electrotechnical Commission.

An Epstein frame comprises a primary and a secondary winding. The sample under test should be prepared as a set of a number of strips (always a multiple of four) cut from electrical steel sheet or ribbon. Each layer of the sample is double-lapped in corners and weighted down with a force of 1 N (see photo). 

The power losses are measured by means of a wattmeter method in which the primary current and secondary voltage are used. During the measurement, the Epstein frame behaves as an unloaded transformer.

Power loss, Pc, is calculated as:

where:
 is the number of turns of primary winding
 is the number of turns of secondary winding
 is the reading of the wattmeter in watts
 is the total resistance of the instruments in the secondary circuit in ohms and
 is the average secondary voltage in volts.

Specific power loss, Ps, is calculated as:

where:
 is the length of the sample in metres
 is the average magnetic path length = 0.94 (constant value)
 is the mass of the sample in kilograms

If all conditions are as defined in the standard, the standard deviation of the reproducibility of the values is not greater than 1.5% up to 1.5 T for non-oriented electrical steel and up to 1.7 T for grain-oriented electrical steel.

Epstein frame commercial products are available from Brockhaus and Magnettechnik Kleine.

See also 
 Soken tester
 Gopal Epstein Tester

References

Magnetism